East of the River is a 1940 American drama film directed by Alfred E. Green and written by Fred Niblo, Jr. The film stars John Garfield, Brenda Marshall, Marjorie Rambeau, George Tobias, William Lundigan and Moroni Olsen. The film was released by Warner Bros. on November 9, 1940.

Plot
Mama Teresa runs a small New York cafe. She keeps son Joe Lorenzo out of reform school and adopts his hopeless, homeless pal Nick, hoping they'll stay out of trouble.

Joe's life of crime pays for Nick's education. He pretends to be out west running a ranch, but Joe is actually doing time in San Quentin prison for his crimes. He gets out and returns to New York with his girl, Laurie Romayne, a convicted forger, to see Nick graduate from college.

Laurie is drawn to Mama's wholesome way of life and also falls for Nick, so Joe threatens to reveal her past. Joe also informs on criminals Scarfi and Turner, who had framed him into landing behind bars. Turner wants revenge after Scarfi is executed, but Joe is able to elude him. His guilty conscience allows Laurie to pursue a relationship with Nick.

Cast

References

External links 
 
 
 
 

1940 films
Warner Bros. films
American drama films
1940 drama films
Films directed by Alfred E. Green
Films scored by Adolph Deutsch
American black-and-white films
1940s English-language films
1940s American films